The Cummins M-series engine is a straight-six diesel engine designed and produced by Cummins.  It displaces .  Introduced as the M11 in 1994, it was built on the previous L10 engine (same  cylinder bore, but a longer  piston stroke compared to the L10's  stroke).

Later M11's received the electronic CELECT and CELECT Plus fuel systems consisting of a gear pump and solenoid controlled injectors. The M11 CELECT Plus became the ISM when Cummins applied its Interact System (hence the "IS" in ISM) to the M11 CELECT Plus in 1998 to further improve the engine.  The ISM is available in four configurations, with slightly-different emphasis on maximum power ( vs. ) and peak torque.

Applications
Large transit bus (40 feet and up). 
Coaches 
 Large fire truck
 Heavy-duty truck
 Off-Highway (QSM11)

Popular power ratings
Urban bus
 @ 1200 rpm,  (209 kW) electronically governed at 2,100 rpm
 @ 1200 rpm,  (246 kW) electronically governed at 2,100 rpm
RV, Truck, Motorcoach
 @ 1200 rpm,  (209 kW) electronically governed at 2,100 rpm
 @ 1200 rpm,  (246 kW) electronically governed at 2,100 rpm
 @ 1200 rpm,  (209 kW) electronically governed at 2,100 rpm
 @ 1200 rpm,  (246 kW) electronically governed at 2,100 rpm
 @ 1200 rpm,  (209 kW) electronically governed at 2,100 rpm
 @ 1200 rpm,  (246 kW) electronically governed at 2,100 rpm
 @ 1200 rpm,  (246 kW) electronically governed at 2,100 rpm
 @ 1200 rpm,  (246 kW) electronically governed at 2,100 rpm
 @ 1200 rpm,  (246 kW) electronically governed at 2,100 rpm
 @ 1200 rpm,  (246 kW) electronically governed at 2,100 rpm
 @ 1200 rpm,  (246 kW) electronically governed at 2,100 rpm

References

External links
Cummins ISM

Cummins diesel engines
Diesel engines by model
Straight-six engines